North Nova Education Centre (NNEC) is a Canadian high school in New Glasgow, Nova Scotia. It serves roughly 1200 students from the eastern side of Pictou County. It is administratively part of the "Celtic Region" of the Chignecto-Central Regional School Board. The school's official colours are blue and white. It teaches a broad variety of materials, from traditional academics, to the Fine Arts, to Co-Op courses. The school is also active in sports and extracurricular activities. In addition, NNEC is one of schools involved in Nova Scotia International Student Program. They host international students from China, Japan, Germany, Turkey, Brazil, South Korea, etc. They provide multi-courses even special help for foreign students to adopt local education and Canadian lifestyles. Each school year, there are two student ambassadors here to help international students and organize events to provide them memories of Nova Scotia. This school also offers a program called CEP (Career Exploration Program). This better prepares students who are planning on going straight into the work force rather than going to university.

History
North Nova Education Centre officially opened on November 24, 2003. The school's colours are light blue, navy blue and white, with the mascot being the Gryphon. The gryphon was comprised to represent the mascots of the four schools which amalgamated to form North Nova Education Centre. The Gryphon has the Sword of the Trojan (Trenton High School), the body of the Panther (New Glasgow High School) and the wings and the head of a Blue Eagle (East Pictou Rural High School). Students from Thorburn Consolidated School attend NNEC as well, but since they were not a high school in 2003, none of the school's mascots were added to the gryphon. However some say that the wings on the gryphon are from the Thorburn Consolidated School mascot of the Skyhawk.

The school is built in a ring design, around a large central courtyard. Sections of the school, or "pods", are organized by course (English, mathematics, sciences, and history studies).

Clubs, committees, and sports
NNEC has many committees, clubs and sports, including the Yearbook Committee, Grad Committee, Website Design Committee, Student Council, Spirit Committee, We-Day Committee and Mental Health Committee. There is also a Youth Health Committee which organizes regular events to promote good health and safety. In addition to these clubs and organizations, there are many sports teams and musical groups

Jazz Choir 
Nova tones
Concert Choir 
Jazz Band
Concert Band 
Beginner Band  
Girls and Boys Rugby
Girls and Boys Soccer
Girls and Boys Basketball
Girls and Boys Hockey
Girls and Boys Curling
Girls and Boys Track and Field
Girls and Boys Cross Country Running
Girls and Boys Badminton
Boys Baseball
Girls Volleyball
Girls Softball
Co-ed Golf
Co-ed Martial Arts (Karate)
Co-ed Skiing
Co-ed Snowboarding
Co-ed Ultimate Frisbee

Sports awards

North Nova Education Centre teams have won championships in several sports, as listed below.

2004-2005
Provincial Girls Softball Championship

2005-2006
Provincial Boys Rugby Championship

2006-2007
Provincial Intermediate Boys Cross-Country Championship 
Provincial Intermediate Boys Track & Field Championship

2008-2009
 Boys and Girls Provincial Championship (Rugby).

2009-2010
Girls Provincial Championship (Rugby)

Music awards

Every year the bands and choir enter the newglasgow music festival.

References

Official Opening of North Nova Education Centre

External links
 North Nova Official Website

High schools in Nova Scotia
New Glasgow, Nova Scotia
Schools in Pictou County